Forkhead box protein M1 is a protein that in humans is encoded by the FOXM1 gene. The protein encoded by this gene is a member of the FOX family of transcription factors. Its potential as a target for future cancer treatments led to it being designated the 2010 Molecule of the Year.

Function 

FOXM1 is known to play a key role in cell cycle progression where endogenous FOXM1 expression peaks at S and G2/M phases. FOXM1-null mouse embryos were neonatal lethal as a result of the development of polyploid cardiomyocytes and hepatocytes, highlighting the role of FOXM1 in mitotic division. More recently a study using transgenic/knockout mouse embryonic fibroblasts and human osteosarcoma cells (U2OS) has shown that FOXM1 regulates expression of a large array of G2/M-specific genes, such as Plk1, cyclin B2, Nek2 and CENPF, and plays an important role in maintenance of chromosomal segregation and genomic stability.

Cancer link 

FOXM1 gene is now known as a human proto-oncogene. Abnormal upregulation of FOXM1 is involved in the oncogenesis of basal cell carcinoma, the most common human cancer worldwide. FOXM1 upregulation was subsequently found in the majority of solid human cancers including liver, breast, lung, prostate, cervix of uterus, colon, and brain.

Isoforms 

There are three FOXM1 isoforms in humans, A, B and C. Isoform FOXM1A has been shown to be a gene transcriptional repressor whereas the remaining isoforms (B and C) are both transcriptional activators. Hence, it is not surprising that FOXM1B and C isoforms have been found to be upregulated in human cancers.

Mechanism of oncogenesis 

The exact mechanism of FOXM1 in cancer formation remains unknown. It is thought that upregulation of FOXM1 promotes oncogenesis through abnormal impact on its multiple roles in cell cycle and chromosomal/genomic maintenance. Aberrant upregulation of FOXM1 in primary human skin keratinocytes can directly induce genomic instability in the form of loss of heterozygosity (LOH) and copy number aberrations.

FOXM1 overexpression is involved in early events of carcinogenesis in head and neck squamous cell carcinoma. It has been shown that nicotine exposure directly activates FOXM1 activity in human oral keratinocytes and induced malignant transformation.

Role in stem cell fate 

A recent report by the research group which first found that the over-expression of FOXM1 is associated with human cancer, showed that aberrant upregulation of FOXM1 in adult human epithelial stem cells induces a precancer phenotype in a 3D-organotypic tissue regeneration system – a condition similar to human hyperplasia. The authors showed that excessive expression of FOXM1 exploits the inherent self-renewal proliferation potential of stem cells by interfering with the differentiation pathway, thereby expanding the progenitor cell compartment. It was therefore hypothesized that FOXM1 induces cancer initiation through stem/progenitor cell expansion.

Role in epigenome regulations 

Given the role in progenitor/stem cells expansion, FOXM1 has been shown to modulate the epigenome. It was found that overexpression of FOXM1 "brain washes" normal cells to adopt cancer-like epigenome. A number of new epigenetic biomarkers influenced by FOXM1 were identified from the study and these were thought to represent epigenetic signature of early cancer development which has potential for early cancer diagnosis and prognosis.

Interactions 

FOXM1 has been shown to interact with Cdh1.

See also 
 FOX proteins

References

External links 
 

Forkhead transcription factors